Molvig is a surname. Notable people with the surname include:

Grynet Molvig (born 1942), Norwegian actress and singer
Jon Molvig (1923–1970), Australian expressionist artist